Steven V. Oroho (born July 26, 1958) is an American Republican Party politician, who has served in the New Jersey Senate since January 8, 2008, where he represents the 24th Legislative District. Oroho is the current State Senate Minority Leader in the current Legislative Session after being elected during a State Senate Republicans Caucus meeting, replacing Thomas Kean Jr.

Oroho announced in January 2023 that he would not seek another term in the November 2023 general election.

New Jersey Senate

Elections

2007 election

Oroho announced in 2007 that he would seek the Republican nomination for the Senate seat being vacated by retiring Senator Robert Littell. With Littell's endorsement, he ran in a competitive primary against Assemblyman Guy Gregg. Oroho out-raised Gregg during the primary campaign. Oroho sought to portray himself as a small government conservative during the campaign. He won the primary and the general election in the Republican 24th district.

2021 election

Republican Daniel Cruz challenged Oroho in the June 3, 2021 primary.

Tenure
Oroho opposes same-sex marriage and has been the senate sponsor of legislation that would allow a public vote in the form of a ballot question to determine whether it should be legalized or banned in New Jersey. He is the primary sponsor of that legislation in the Senate. In June 2009 he was one of seven senators to vote against putting open space bond question on the November ballot. Oroho serves in the Senate on the Budget and Appropriations Committee and the Economic Growth Committee. He served on the Franklin Borough Council from 2001 to 2006 and on the Sussex County Board of Chosen Freeholders from 2005 to 2007. In 2018 Oroho made calls to bring back the death penalty in New Jersey.

Committees 
Joint Budget Oversight
New Jersey Legislative Select Oversight
Budget and Appropriations
Economic Growth

District 24 
Each of the 40 districts in the New Jersey Legislature has one representative in the New Jersey Senate and two members in the New Jersey General Assembly. The representatives from the 24th District for the 2022—23 Legislative Session are:
 Senator Steve Oroho (R)
 Assemblyman Parker Space (R)
 Assemblyman Hal Wirths (R)

Electoral history

New Jersey Senate

References

External links 
Senator Steven Oroho's Official Site
Senator Oroho's legislative webpage, New Jersey Legislature
New Jersey Legislature financial disclosure forms
2011 2010 2009 2008 2007

|-

1958 births
21st-century American politicians
County commissioners in New Jersey
Living people
New Jersey city council members
Republican Party New Jersey state senators
People from Franklin, New Jersey
Saint Francis University alumni